Social Democrats of Uganda is a political party in Uganda, founded in 2003. The party was registered with the Election Commission of Uganda on April 1, 2004. The founding president of SDU was Nabilah Sempala. Later, Sempala the left SDU for the Forum for Democratic Change.

References

Political parties in Uganda
Social democratic parties